Eupithecia phantastica is a moth in the family Geometridae. It is found in Zhejiang in China and in Taiwan.

The forewings are pale brown and the hindwings are whitish grey.

References

External links

Moths described in 2006
Moths of Asia
phantastica